Unavenged is a 2011 album by Random Encounter consisting of 17 songs, contemporary rock arrangements of the music from various video game soundtracks. This represents a fan-made mix between video game covers and original songs inspired by video games. The art and theme of the album is reflective of Random Encounter’s fictional heritage as a Russian-American band of monster hunters and explains their band's hatred for their nemesis, Koschei the Deathless.

The album is Random Encounter's first, having been in existence for over five years and in its fifth incarnation. Promotion for the album was primarily based out of Random Encounter's website, Facebook, and was supplemented by various tour stops around the United States during the PvP (Player versus Performer) Summer Tour, as well as regular performances in their home city Orlando, Florida.

Track listing
"Introduction" – 2:15
originally from Final Fantasy VI
"Terra " – 2:15
originally from Final Fantasy VI
 "-72 Hours-" – 2:59
an original inspired by Majora’s Mask
 "The Legend of Zelda" (Introduction, Labyrinth, Song of Storms) – 3:54
originally from The Legend of Zelda
 "Gerudo Valley" – 2:24
originally from The Legend of Zelda
 "Unavenged" – 3:03
an original
 "Восхитительный эгоист (Vos heeteEtel'nee egoIst)" – 4:20
an original inspired by Diablo
 "Vampire Killer" – 1:11
originally from Castlevania
 "Big Blue" – 2:17
originally from F Zero
 "Ahead on Our Way" – 2:22
originally from Final Fantasy V
 "Sonic Suite" – 7:17
originally from Sonic The Hedgehog
 "Boletarian Syndrome" – 2:57
an original inspired by Demon's Souls
 "Clash at the Big Bridge" (Gilgamesh) – 2:16
originally from Final Fantasy V
 "Still More Fighting" – 2:54
originally from Final Fantasy VII
 "Millennial Faire" – 2:50
originally from Chrono Trigger
 "Mother’s Brain" – 2:35
an original inspired by Metroid and “Final Fantasy VII”
 "Miss You" – 3:18
an original
contains hidden track "What’s Up People?"
The album is available for free listening and download on the Random Encounter website.

Personnel
Random Encounter (band)
Careless – accordion, glockenspiel, vocals
Rook – Bass guitar, vocals
Moose – drums, Vocals
Konami – electric guitar, acoustic steel string guitar
Kit – electric guitar
Zeff Spooky – Synth-Bass
Rob Kleiner – Mixing and Mastering

“Guest artists”
Sir Dr. Robert Bakker The Protomen – acoustic steel string guitar
Juja – electric guitar
Auriplane – bass guitar
Jonathan Frank – acoustic steel string guitar
Elaine Li (Select Start) – Violin
Helios - piano

Reception
Unavenged has been given critical acclaim by The Nerdy Show, Badass Of The Week, and been nominated by Square Enix Music Online for fan arranged album of the year, 2011.

See also
Video game music culture

External links and references
Random Encounter’s homepage
Random Encounter’s Facebook

References

2011 albums
Video game soundtracks
Tribute albums
Random Encounter (band) albums